Zombillenium is a 2017 French-Belgian animated film directed by Arthur de Pins and Alexis Ducord, based on the comic series of the same name. It was shown in the Special Screening section at the 2017 Cannes Film Festival.

Cast
 Emmanuel Curtil as Hector
 Alain Choquet as Francis
 Kelly Marot as Gretchen
 Alexis Tomassian as Steven

See also
 Geraldine (2000 film), an animated short film by Arthur de Pins

References

External links
 

2017 films
2017 animated films
2010s French animated films
2010s French-language films
Belgian animated films
Films based on Belgian comics
Animated films based on comics
French-language Belgian films
2010s French films